Daniel Chamier (1564–1621) was a Huguenot minister in France, founder of the Academy of Montpellier and author.

Life and work
Chamier was born at the castle of Le Mont, near Mocas and west of Grenoble. His father was from Avignon and a Protestant convert, a pastor at Montélimar. Daniel studied at the now defunct University of Orange (1365-1793) and at Geneva under Theodore Beza and Antoine de la Faye (1540–1615), in the period 1583 to 1589. He was ordained minister at Montpellier, and about 1595 succeeded his father at Montélimar.

His provincial synod appointed him deputy to the National Synod at Saumur, and the gathering at Loudun in 1596. He was involved in drafting the Edict of Nantes,  and brought the Edict to the Synod of Montpellier in 1598. In 1601 and 1602 he took part in discussions at Montpellier with the Jesuits Pierre Coton and Gaultier. In 1603 he presided over the National Synod at Gap, France, where an article was added to the Reformed Confession of faith declaring the Pope to be the Antichrist.

In 1607 Henry IV of France granted him permission as representative of the Church of Dauphiné to establish an academy at Montpellier, and he became professor there. Chamier returned, however, after a short time to Montélimar. In 1612 he became pastor and professor at Montauban. When Louis XIII besieged the city in 1621, Chamier sent his students to the walls, and was mortally wounded during the defense.

Family
He was married, his wife's name being Portal. They had a son, Adrien, and three daughters.

English actor Daniel Craig is among his descendants (link partially broken by John Ezechiel Chamier who was born under surname Deschamps but requested to be changed by his uncle Anthony Chamier and ended with Georgette Grace Chamier who married John Charin Wroughton and only Chamier sibling with children)., as well as Anthony Chamier, George Chamier, Frederick Chamier, Edward Chamier and John Adrian Chamier.

Works
He was a supralapsarian but differed from John Calvin concerning Christ's descent into hell and angels. He wrote:

 Dispute de la vocation des ministres de l'Église reformée (La Rochelle, 1589);
 Epistolæ jesuiticæ (Geneva, 1599);
 La confusion des disputes papistes (1600); 
 Disputatio scholastico-theologica de œcumenico pontifice (1601); 
 Panstratia Catholica, seu Corpus Controversiarum adversus Pontificios (Geneva, 1606);
 La Honte de Babylone (Sédan, 1612);
 La Jésuitomanie (Montauban, 1618); 
 Corpus Theologicum, seu Loci Communes Theologici (Geneva, 1653);
 Journal du voyage de M. D. Chamier à Paris et à la cour de Henri IV. en 1607 (ed. C. Read, Paris, 1858).

Notes

External links
Journal du voyage de M. D. Chamier at archive.org

Attribution

1564 births
1621 deaths
French Calvinist and Reformed ministers
Huguenots
17th-century Calvinist and Reformed theologians
French Calvinist and Reformed theologians
17th-century French theologians